Benjamin Fitzpatrick (born December 15, 1994) is an American soccer coach and retired player who played as a midfielder. He appeared for FC London, Michigan Bucks, and Cleveland SC at the semi-professional level and played professionally with Pittsburgh Riverhounds SC.

College and amateur
Fitzpatrick started his college career at Urbana University, where he studied sports management and earned numerous accolades. He then transferred to Ohio State University and spent a season with the Buckeyes' soccer team.

Michigan Bucks
Before transferring to Ohio State, Fitzpatrick played for the Michigan Bucks in the Premier Development League and starred as the Bucks claimed the 2016 title.

Club career

Pittsburgh Riverhounds SC
After leaving Ohio State, Fitzpatrick joined United Soccer League side Pittsburgh Riverhounds. He made his senior debut against Charlotte Independence, playing 90 minutes in a 1–1 draw.

Career statistics

References

External links
 Urbana profile
 Ohio State profile
 
 

1994 births
Living people
American soccer players
Soccer players from Ohio
People from Hilliard, Ohio
Association football midfielders
Ohio State Buckeyes men's soccer players
Flint City Bucks players
Pittsburgh Riverhounds SC players
Cleveland SC players
USL Championship players
National Premier Soccer League players
USL League Two players